Blood and Sand may refer to:

 Sangre y arena, a 1908 novel by Vicente Blasco Ibáñez, which was the basis for four films:
 Blood and Sand (1916 film), directed by Ibáñez himself
 Blood and Sand (1922 film), starring Rudolph Valentino, Lila Lee, and Nita Naldi
 Blood and Sand (1941 film), directed by Rouben Mamoulian starring Tyrone Power, Linda Darnell, and Rita Hayworth
 Blood and Sand (1989 film), Spanish film starring Chris Rydell, Sharon Stone, and Ana Torrent
Fort Graveyard, a 1965 Japanese war film also known as Chi to Suna (Blood and Sand).
 Spartacus: Blood and Sand, a 2010 television series
 Blood and Sand (cocktail), a Scotch-based cocktail

See also 
 Sand and Blood, a 1988 French film